Vito Simonetti (born 26 March 1903, date of death unknown) was an Argentine fencer. He competed at the 1948 and 1952 Summer Olympics.

References

1903 births
Year of death missing
Argentine male fencers
Argentine épée fencers
Olympic fencers of Argentina
Fencers at the 1948 Summer Olympics
Fencers at the 1952 Summer Olympics
Pan American Games medalists in fencing
Pan American Games gold medalists for Argentina
Fencers at the 1951 Pan American Games